Ingrid A. Rimland, also known as Ingrid Zündel (May 22, 1936 – October 12, 2017), was an American writer. She wrote several novels based upon her own experiences growing up in a Mennonite community in Ukraine and as a refugee child during World War II. Her novel The Wanderers (1977), which won her the California Literature Medal Award for best fiction, tells the story of the plight of Mennonite women caught in the social upheavals of revolution and war. Rimland died on October 12, 2017.

Biography

Born into a Russian-German Mennonite community in Ukraine she grew up trilingual (German, Russian and Ukrainian) in the Soviet Union. Her family had been wealthy prior to the Russian revolution, but the community faced persecution under the communist regime due to their pacifist beliefs and heritage. In 1941, when she was five years old, her father was deported to Siberia. Fleeing the Red Army, she ended up in Germany with her mother in 1945. After several years as a refugee, they emigrated to an isolated Mennonite community of Volendam in the rainforests of Paraguay in 1948, with the help of Dutch and American Mennonites.

In Paraguay, she married and had one son. The family immigrated to Canada in 1960, settling in St. Catharines, Ontario, where their second son was born,  and then to the United States in 1967, where she eventually became a US citizen. In 1971, she graduated from Wichita State University with a bachelor's degree. She earned a Master's and then, in 1979, a doctorate of education (Ed.D) from the University of the Pacific, California.

Rimland worked as an educational psychologist in California public schools, specializing in special education and migrant education for children. She later worked in the state as an education consultant and testing specialist in an area consisting of six school districts comprising approximately 40 schools, and simultaneously running a private practice in child psychology.

Literary works 
Most of her literary work is autobiographical to various extents. Her 1977 novel The Wanderers traces the decimation of the pacifist Russian Mennonite community during the Russian Revolution, anarchy, famine, the Stalinist purges, escape from Ukraine, and eventual resettlement in the rain forests of Paraguay. Her 1984 book, The Furies and the Flame, is her autobiography as an immigrant and deals with her struggle to raise her handicapped child.

In her third book, Demon Doctor, Rimland recounts her quest to find Nazi war criminal Josef Mengele in the 1980s with the help of Simon Wiesenthal. She had believed that Mengele worked as a doctor in her Paraguayan Mennonite community of Volendam, but was unable to prove this.

Her trilogy Lebensraum was written after she began to deny the Holocaust in the 1990s and is "permeated with anti-Semitism." The books were "not marketed at all, or withdrawn almost immediately after publication."

Relationship with Ernst Zündel
In September 1994, Rimland first met German-born Holocaust denier Ernst Zündel, who was then a resident in Canada, at the twelfth International Revisionist Conference held by the Institute for Historical Review, a Holocaust denial organisation. Interviewed by Zündel on his television programs at the time, she said Adolf Hitler  “brought into our colonies the values that we had always held dear, namely the family cohesion, the pride in race, which was part of my upbringing.” She founded his website Zundelsite.org from her home in California. Zündel became her second husband in 2001 and the couple moved to Tennessee. Around 2011, Rimland produced the film Off Your Knees, Germany! which was about Zündel's two trials in Canada for deliberately publishing fake news about the Holocaust, for which he was ultimately imprisoned and deported. Rimland did not move to Germany to be with Zundel after his prison time was up and he was released to live in his former family home there. Zundel recounted meeting Rimland in Mexico in order to avoid their being together in three countries they both despised: Germany, the U.S., and Canada. Her death occurred just a month and a half after Zundel died in 2017.

References

External links

1936 births
2017 deaths
American women psychologists
20th-century American novelists
20th-century American women writers
American historical novelists
Women historical novelists
American women novelists
American Holocaust deniers
American Mennonites
Canadian anti-communists
Paraguayan anti-communists
Canadian Holocaust deniers
Paraguayan emigrants to the United States
Soviet emigrants to Paraguay
American people of German-Russian descent
American neo-Nazis
Mennonite writers
Nazi hunters
American child psychologists
Canadian neo-Nazis